KYKY (98.1 FM) is a commercial radio station in St. Louis, Missouri, serving the Greater St. Louis region of Missouri and Illinois. KYKY airs a Hot AC radio format and is owned by Audacy, Inc. KYKY operates from offices and studios located on Olive Street in Downtown St. Louis. Its transmitter is on a TV/FM radio tower off Mackenzie Road in Shrewsbury.

KYKY broadcasts three HD Radio signals, with the first airing its main hot AC format. Its HD2 signal carries a sports gambling format.

History
On April 2, 1960, KSTL-FM first signed on as the FM counterpart to daytime-only KSTL (690 AM), owned by Radio St. Louis, Inc. KSTL-FM was sold in 1967 to Foreground Music, Inc., and changed its call sign to KRCH. It aired a more uptempo easy listening format than competing beautiful music stations.

In 1972, the station was purchased by Bartell Media Corporation, the owner of legendary AM Top 40 stations KCBQ in San Diego and WOKY in Milwaukee, and was enjoying high ratings with WDRQ in Detroit as more people were tuning to FM stations for contemporary hits in the 1970s. Bartell turned KRCH into Top 40 outlet KSLQ. Around 1981, KSLQ adjusted its format to adult contemporary. In October 1982, the call letters were changed to the current KYKY, and rebranded as "KY98", which would later change to "Y98". In 1985, KYKY was purchased by EZ Communications, and evolved the format to hot AC.

In 1997, EZ Communications was purchased by American Radio Systems, who would later merge with Infinity Broadcasting, which in turn was acquired by CBS Radio. From March 1979 to October 2017, KYKY was the home of the Phillips & Company (originally Phillips & Wall) morning show, hosted by long-time St. Louis radio host Guy Phillips. Phillips was inducted into the St. Louis Radio Hall of fame in 2005. In January 2010, KYKY's slogan was changed from "Your Music, Your Y98" to "More Music. Better Variety". Around 2010, KYKY changed its slogan to "Today's Best Music".

On February 2, 2017, CBS Radio announced it would merge with Entercom. The merger was approved on November 9, 2017, and was consummated on November 17.

Hurricane Katrina Telethon
In September 2005, KYKY, sister station KEZK-FM, and television partners KSDK and KETC simulcast a telethon for Hurricane Katrina relief that raised more than $5 million. The telethon featured an appearance by actor John Goodman, a native of Affton, Missouri who now calls New Orleans his home and whose family was actually missing for a time during the storm's peak. Singer Sheryl Crow, a native of Kennett, Missouri, and her then-fiancé Lance Armstrong, urged viewers to call when they were interviewed by telephone from the region.

References

External links

Hot adult contemporary radio stations in the United States
Adult top 40 radio stations in the United States
Radio stations established in 1960
YKY
1960 establishments in Missouri
Audacy, Inc. radio stations